Namulau'ulu Lauaki Tuilagi Vavae Leo II (2 November 1945 — 8 November 2020) was a Samoan politician and former Deputy Speaker of the Legislative Assembly of Samoa. He was a member of the Human Rights Protection Party.

Namulau'ulu  was born in Tuasivi. He was a heavyweight boxing champion. After travelling to Australia and Fiji he worked as a Deputy Registrar of the Land and Titles Court of Samoa for 15 years, before returning to Fatausi in 1986 to become village high chief.

He was elected to the Legislative Assembly of Samoa at the 1988 election and served as Deputy Speaker. He lost his seat at the 1991 election.

Family
Namulau'ulu was the father of rugby players Freddie Tuilagi, Henry Tuilagi, Alesana Tuilagi, Anitelea Tuilagi, Vavae Tuilagi and Manu Tuilagi.

References

1945 births
2020 deaths
Members of the Legislative Assembly of Samoa
Human Rights Protection Party politicians
People from Fa'asaleleaga